Gabriele Mulazzi (born 1 April 2003) is an Italian professional footballer who plays as a full-back for  club Juventus Next Gen.

Club career 

Mulazzi started playing football aged five in an amateur club situated in Settimo Torinese. He then moved to Torino's youth setup where he stayed for three years, when he moved to Juventus'. He spent his whole youth career at Juventus across all of their youth squads. On 23 September 2020, he signed his first contract with Juventus, which would expire in 2023. On 2 April 2021, he was first called up by Juventus U23 alongside his U19 teammate Samuel Iling-Junior for a Serie C match against Alessandria.

In the 2021–22 season, spent with the under-19s, Mulazzi scored seven goals and gave eight assists in all competitions. Despite being listed as a right-back, he played 27 of his 36 season matches as a midfielder. He helped the U19s reach the 2021–22 UEFA Youth League semifinals, their best-ever placing in the competition.

He made his professional debut on 3 September 2022, in a 2–0 win against Trento, playing for Juventus Next Gen. On 20 December, Mulazzi renewed with Juventus Next Gen until 2026.

Style of play 
As a kid, Mulazzi was a forward. He is currently a full-back who can play as a winger.

Career statistics

References

Notelist 

2003 births
Living people
Footballers from Turin
Italian footballers
Association football fullbacks
Torino F.C. players
Juventus F.C. players
Juventus Next Gen players
Serie C players
Italy youth international footballers